A16, A 16, A.16 or A-16 may refer to:
A16 road, in several countries
 ATC code A16, Other alimentary tract and metabolism products, a subgroup of the Anatomical Therapeutic Chemical Classification System
 British NVC community A16 (Callitriche stagnalis community), a British Isles plant community

It may also refer to:
 A16, a restaurant in the San Francisco Bay Area
 Subfamily A16, a rhodopsin-like receptors subfamily
 One of the Encyclopaedia of Chess Openings codes for the English Opening in chess
 Washington A16, 2000 Protests in Washington, D.C. against the International Monetary Fund and the World Bank on April 16 of 2000 and 2005, both known as "A16"

Technology
 Apple A16 Bionic, a system on a chip mobile processor designed by Apple

Transportation
 Aviadesign A-16 Sport Falcon, an American light-sport aircraft
 Focke-Wulf A.16, a 1926 German three-four passenger light transport monoplane
 A16 station, an upcoming MTR station on the West Rail line Tuen Mun South extension